The 7th Continental Regiment, also known as Prescott's Regiment, was raised April 23, 1775, as a Massachusetts militia regiment at Cambridge, Massachusetts, under Colonel William Prescott. The regiment joined the Continental Army in June 1775. The regiment saw action during the Siege of Boston and the New York Campaign. On January 1, 1777, the regiment was disbanded and volunteers from the regiment joined the 2nd Massachusetts Regiment.

External links
Bibliography of the Continental Army in Massachusetts compiled by the United States Army Center of Military History

Massachusetts regiments of the Continental Army
Military units and formations established in 1775
Military units and formations disestablished in 1777